Mesoflavibacter profundi is a Gram-negative, aerobic and rod-shaped bacterium from the genus of Mesoflavibacter which has been isolated from a seamount from the  northern Mariana Trench.

References

Flavobacteria
Bacteria described in 2018